is a compilation album by Japanese singer/songwriter Chisato Moritaka. It was released on November 26, 2004, five years after she retired from the music industry. The album features songs selected by Moritaka herself, including a chorus and drum re-recording of the song "Dotchi mo Dotchi". Instead of one booklet, My Favorites includes two mini-booklets: one with liner notes and the other with lyrics.

The album peaked at No. 71 on Oricon's albums chart and sold over 7,000 copies.

Track listing 
All lyrics are written by Chisato Moritaka; all music is arranged by Yuichi Takahshi, except where indicated.

Personnel 
 Chisato Moritaka – vocals, drums (1)
 Yuichi Takahashi – guitar, programming (1)
 Shin Hashimoto – piano (1)
 Yukio Seto – bass (1)
 Tatsuya Maruyama – viola, strings arrangement (1)
 Daisuke Inobe – viola (1)
 Masami Horisawa – cello (1)
 Ayano Kasahara – cello (1)

Charts

References

External links 
  (Chisato Moritaka)
  (Up-Front Works)
 

2004 compilation albums
Chisato Moritaka compilation albums
Japanese-language compilation albums
Zetima compilation albums